Koma County is an administrative area in Maiwut State, South Sudan.

References

Counties of South Sudan